Balkholme is a hamlet in the civil parish of Kilpin and the East Riding of Yorkshire, England.

In 1823, Baines recorded that Balkholme was in the parish of Howden, and the wapentake and liberty of Howdenshire, and had a population of 105 including eight farmers.

At the east side of Balkholme is West Linton Farmhouse, a Grade II listed late 18th-century house, of two-storeys and three-bays. It is built of red brick in Flemish bond, with pantile roof, and has a 19th-century wing.

There is a small RAF memorial garden on Brow Lane where a mid-air collision occurred during the Second World War between two Halifax Bombers of 578 Squadron.

References

External links

Villages in the East Riding of Yorkshire
Aviation accidents and incidents locations in England